Shane R. Baumel (born February 12, 1997) is an American former actor. He made his film debut playing Crispin in Daddy Day Care. He also had a role in Wild Hogs, starring Tim Allen, and appeared on TV a few times, in shows such as The Emperor's New School, as the voice of Tipo. He has additionally appeared in the 2004 TV movie "A Boyfriend for Christmas" and in Adventures in Odyssey, a Christian radio drama, as the voice of Everett Meltsner.

Filmography

Film

Television

Video games

References

External links
 

 

1997 births
Living people
American male child actors
21st-century American male actors